Gujarat Technological University (International Innovative University), commonly referred as GTU, is a state university affiliating many engineering, pharmacy, and management colleges in Gujarat state, India. The university is headed by the state government and came into existence on 16 May 2007. Engineering institutes such as Lalbhai Dalpatbhai College of Engineering, Birla Vishvakarma Mahavidyalaya, Vishwakarma Government Engineering College and many Government Engineering Colleges are a part of GTU.

Earlier, Gujarat University was the prime university of Gujarat state heading all colleges including technical colleges. To ensure more efficient, and systematic imparting of technical education, the state government formulated GTU. GTU declares results all around from February to April for winter exams and all around from June to August of summer exams. Currently 485 Colleges are affiliated to this GTU from across Gujarat with over 400,000 students.

Affiliated colleges
Gujarat Technological University  Diploma, Degree and Master of engineering courses comprising to Ph.D. Doctoral Programs and Pharmacy courses for Bachelors and Masters, Management courses and MCA.

Notable affiliated Engineering colleges include:
 A. D. Patel Institute of Technology
 Vadodara Institute Of Engineering, Vadodara
 Dalia Institute Of Diploma Studies, Kheda
 B.K. Mody Government Pharmacy College Rajkot
 Babaria Institute of Technology
 Government Engineering College Rajkot
 C. K. Pithawala College of Engineering and Technology
 Vidhyadeep Institute of Engineering & Technology
 Dr. Jivraj Mehta Institute of Technology, Anand
 G. H. Patel College of Engineering and Technology
 G. K. Bharad Institute of Engineering 
 Government Engineering College, Bharuch
 Government Engineering College, Godhra
 Government Engineering College, Palanpur
 Government Engineering College, Bhavnagar
 Government Engineering College, Dahod
 Government Engineering College, Gandhinagar
 Government Engineering College, Modasa
 Government Engineering College, Patan
 Government Polytechnic College Daman
 Government Polytechnic College Diu
 Institute of Technology and Management Universe
 K.J. Institute Of Engineering and Technology, Vadodara
 L. J. Institute of Engineering and Technology
 Lalbhai Dalpatbhai College of Engineering
 Lukhdhirji Engineering College
 Sal engineering and Technical institute
 Sardar Patel College of Engineering, Bakrol
 Sardar Vallabhbhai Patel Institute of Technology
 Sarvajanik College of Engineering and Technology
 Shantilal Shah Engineering College
 Shri S'ad Vidya Mandal Institute of Technology
 Shree K.J Polytechnic, Bharuch
 Silver Oak College of Engineering and Technology
 Vishwakarma Government Engineering College
 Central institute of plastics technology Ahmedabad
 Valia Institutes of Technologies
 Laxminarayan Dev College of Pharmacy, Bharuch
 Narnarayan Shastri institute of technology, Ahmedabad
Laxmi Institute of Technology, Sarigam

→ The list of Colleges that are De-affiliated this year includes:
1) RK university
2) Uka Tarsadia University
3) KadiSarva Vidyalaya
4) Indus university
5) C. U shah university
6) G.L.S university
7) Parul University 
8) Sakalchand university
9) Marwadi University 
10) Anant National University
11)Gokul Global University
12) Swaanim Startup and innovation university
13) Indrasil University
14) Atmiya University
15) CVM university 
16) ITM university
17) Bhagwan Mahavir University
18) LJK university
19) Silver Oak University
20) Monark University

GTU Innovation Council
GTU established the 'GTU Innovation Council' at ACPC Building, LD Campus in the year 2013. GTU Innovation Council, also known as GIC, is headed by Hiranmay Mahanta. The aim of the GTU Innovation council is to facilitate student startups by providing necessary facilities, organizing workshops, helping students to find relevant mentors, and other activities weekly. GIC also conducts workshops on Training the professors, Flash Ventures, Social Entrepreneurship Bootcamp, Design Thinking and Ideation workshops. GIC established a separate wing of IP Clinic, which helps students to easily patent their innovative ideas and projects. GIC also looks after GTU's UDP program, which authenticates Final year student projects, on quality and genuineness perspectives. Thus it will give them relevant ideas.

GTU Innovation Council took the momentum when they launched the Crowdfunding Initiator program in association with Start51, an indigenous crowd-funding platform in India. Crowdfunding Initiator (CFI) is aimed to help student startups with necessary guidance and funding. About 70 student startups from around Gujarat enrolled, out of which only a few projects were selected for the one-month-long Bootcamp. This Bootcamp which was organized from 16 June 2014 to 12 July 2014, was divided into four-part: Ideation, Incentive Model, Pitch Presentation and Funding. By the end of Bootcamp, Crowdfunding Initiator successfully took 8 projects to live on a dedicated crowdfunding portal for funding.

References

External links
 Official website
 G.T.U Information Portal

India articles needing attention
Universities in Gujarat
2007 establishments in Gujarat
Educational institutions established in 2007